Barkot may refer to:

Barkot, Uttarakhand, a town in India
Barkot, Khyber Pakhtunkhwa, a town in Pakistan

See also
Barkote, a town in Debagarh, Odisha, India